Naval Air Museum Barbers Point was a military museum in Kapolei, Hawaii.

The museum preserves the history of the co-located Naval Air Station Barbers Point. Its exhibits include former U.S. Navy, U.S. Coast Guard, and U.S. Marine Corps aircraft including the McDonnell Douglas F-4 Phantom II, Douglas A-4 Skyhawk, Lockheed P-3C Orion, and Sikorsky UH-3H Sea King, among others. 

Established in 1999, the Museum was forced to close in June 2020 after longstanding difficulties with the State of Hawaii.

References

External links
 Aviation Pros article on disposal of the Museum's aircraft collection
 Local KITV news article on the Museum's eviction
 2019 Warbird Digest article on the eviction of the Museum
 2014 article on the museum in Warbirds Digest

Military and war museums in Hawaii
1999 establishments in Hawaii
Museums in Honolulu County, Hawaii
Museums established in 1999